234 (two hundred [and] thirty-four) is the integer following 233 and preceding 235.

Additionally: 

 234 is a practical number.

 There are 234 ways of grouping six children into rings of at least two children with one child at the center of each ring.

References

Integers